Eugène Criqui (15 August 1893 – 7 July 1977) was a French boxer who held the World Featherweight title in 1923.  After his death, he was added to the International Boxing Hall of Fame.

Eugène was the 2015 Inductee for the Australian National Boxing Hall of Fame International category.

Boxing career

Early career and military service 

Criqui was born in the Belleville neighbourhood of Paris. He was a professional pipe-fitter before he turned professional in 1910. He won the French flyweight title in 1912. His boxing career was interrupted when he served in the French military in World War I. While doing guard duty at Verdun, his jaw was shattered by a sniper's bullet. A surgeon reconstructed the jaw using wire, silver, and a goat leg.

World featherweight champion 

After the war he resumed boxing. He won the French featherweight title in 1921 and the next year won the European Boxing Union featherweight championship. On 2 June 1923 he beat Johnny Kilbane by a sixth-round knockout in New York City to win the world featherweight title. Part of the contract for this fight required that he give Johnny Dundee a shot at the title within sixty days. When he fought Dundee fifty-four days later (on 26 July 1923) Dundee knocked him down four times and beat him by a fifteen-round decision. In his next fight, Criqui injured his hand and did not fight many more fights before he retired in 1928.

Death 

He died blind in a nursing home in 1977. He was inducted into the International Boxing Hall of Fame in 2005, making him the second inductee from France after Marcel Cerdan.

Professional boxing record

References

External links
 
International Boxing Hall of Fame Biography

Featherweight boxers
1893 births
1977 deaths
International Boxing Hall of Fame inductees
French male boxers
Boxers from Paris
French military personnel of World War I